A rug is a piece of cloth, similar to a carpet, but it does not span the width of a room and is not attached to the floor. It is generally used as a floor covering, or as a decorative feature. Rug making is the process of crafting a rug from various textile materials. Historically, there has been a variety of methods of rug making, including braiding, hooking, and weaving. These processes can be carried out by hand, using smaller tools like a latch hook, or using a weaving machine. Rag rugs are a historically notable and widespread form of hooked rug making. Rug hooking is both an art and a craft where rugs are made by pulling loops of yarn or fabric through a stiff woven base such as burlap, linen, or rug warp. The loops are pulled through the backing material by using a crochet-type hook mounted in a handle (usually wood) for leverage.

Braided
Braided rugs are made by using three or more strips of fabric, usually wool, folding the raw edges to the middle and braiding them together. For an oval rug the centre braid should be one inch longer than the width-length in feet. example 2' x 4' rug centre strip would be 2'2" long. The centre braid is laced together and new strips are sewn on to make the braid longer as lacing continues.

Hooking

Traditional rug hooking is a craft in which rugs are made by pulling loops of yarn or fabric through a stiff woven base such as burlap, linen, rug warp or monks cloth. The loops are pulled through the backing material by using a latch hook mounted in a handle (usually wood) for leverage.

Rag rugs

Rag rugs were commonly made in households up to the middle of the 20th century by using odd scraps of fabric on a background of old sacking. Rag rugs became widespread during the Industrial Revolution to the nineteenth century, but by the 1920s the craft was dying out except in areas of poverty or where tradition had a stronger hold. The necessity for thrift during World War II brought a brief revival, but it did not last long.

Prodded
Proddy rugs are made, as the name implies, by prodding or poking strips of fabric through hessian or linen from the back side. Rag rugs made this way have many names, such as clippies, stobbies, clippers and peggies. In Northumberland they are called proggy mats, and in Scotland they are called clootie mats. They were often made for more utilitarian use such as by the back door, their pile hiding dirt well.

The Museum of English Rural Life has a collection of rug-making tools and thrift rugs.

Woven

These are both handmade and machine-made (see carpet). Woven rugs include both flat rugs (for example kilims) and pile rugs. The more tightly a rug is woven or knotted, the more detailed a design can be. "It is generally believed that the density of knots, the age, the material, and the rarity of the design or knots determines the value of a carpet. ..."

See also
 Afghan carpet
 Flooring
 Gabbeh
 Heatsetting
 Knot density
 Oriental rugs
 Tapestry
 Moroccan rugs

References

Rugs and carpets
Textile techniques